Blue Monday may refer to:

Music
"Blue Monday" (New Order song), a 1983 song by New Order
"Blue Monday" (Fats Domino song), a 1950s song first recorded by Smiley Lewis and popularized by Fats Domino
Blue Monday (Flunk album), a 2002 album by Flunk
"Blue Monday" (White Lion song), a 1991 instrumental by White Lion guitarist Vito Bratta
Blue Monday (opera), the original name of a George Gershwin one-act "jazz opera"
Blue Monday (band), a Vancouver hardcore punk band

Other uses
Blue Monday (term), workers hungover from a weekend's drinking
Blue Monday (comics), a comic book by Chynna Clugston-Major
Blue Monday (date), supposedly the most depressing day of the year
"Blue Monday" (Eureka Seven episode), the pilot episode of the anime series Eureka Seven
Blue Monday, weekly blues and jazz show created by Austin, Texas, DJ Larry Monroe
The last game of the 1981 National League Championship Series between the Montreal Expos and the Los Angeles Dodgers

See also
Goodbye Blue Monday (disambiguation)